Allan Vito Flores Caidic (born June 15, 1963) is a Filipino former professional basketball player in the Philippine Basketball Association. He is considered by many to be the greatest shooter the country has ever produced, thus, earning the moniker,  "The Triggerman".

He played college hoops at the University of the East before joining the PBA in 1987, where he broke several Philippine and PBA all-time records—including the most points scored in a single game (79 points), the most three-point field goals made in a single game (17 triples; breaking his previous record of 15 triples), the most consecutive freethrows made (76), and the most three-point field goals in a career (1,242 triples; later surpassed by Jimmy Alapag). He has played with several PBA teams and won numerous championships. He played for the Philippine national basketball team including the 1998 Philippine Centennial Team.

While in the league, he was considered one of the best three-point shooters in Asia. The vaunted Chinese national basketball team recognized his ability by always reminding their players to be on the lookout for "Philippine No. 8", referring to Caidic's regular jersey number while playing for the National Team.

Playing career

High school, college and amateur career
Caidic is from Paete, Laguna and started playing basketball when he was in his fifth grade at Roosevelt College and in the Inter Subdivision Leagues at Brookside in Cainta before trying out for college teams such as the Ateneo Blue Eagles and the Mapua Cardinals but was unsuccessful. He then tried out for the Letran Knights and was accepted. But after realizing that Letran does not have an engineering program, he left. Allan was then taking up Mechanical Engineering. He was later accepted in University of the East (UE) but had to sit out on the reserve list as UE's lineup was already complete. Finally in 1981 under coach Roberto Flores, Caidic got his break and delivered well. In a deciding game between the UE Red Warriors and the FEU Tamaraws, Caidic missed two crucial free throws that handed the UAAP championship to the unbeaten Tamaraws. In 1982, he bounced back by leading the Red Warriors to a comeback win against the UP Fighting Maroons in the finals, scoring 30 points to capture the UAAP basketball championship and won the Most Valuable Player award.

In 1983, Caidic was seeded number one in the UAAP one-on-one championships. Unfortunately, he only placed second to UST's rookie Silverio Palad. In his final two years, he, along with Jerry Codiñera, led the Red Warriors to back-to-back championships in 1984–1985, the last University of the East basketball team ever to win a championship in the 20th Century. At the same time, he played for several teams in the Philippine Amateur Basketball League while playing for the national team.

He played for several PABL teams such as CF Sharp, ESQ Marketing and the Magnolia Ice Cream/Lagerlite. He also played for commercial teams internationally, notably the Development Bank of Rizal (1983) that finished third in an invitational tournament in Malaysia and the Country Fair Hotdogs in the 1984 William Jones Cup tournament.

Northern Consolidated National Team
In 1984–1985, Caidic was part of Danding Cojuangco’s national basketball development program, which formed a team that represented the Philippines in international competitions, which aimed win the 1986 Asian Basketball Confederation crown (now known as the FIBA Asia Championship) which was last won by the Philippines in 1973.

In the 1985 William Jones Cup, Caidic played in the San Miguel Beer-Philippines’ overtime victory against the US, coached by Gene Keady, in the finals. His shooting mentor, Arthur "Chip" Engelland, scored 43 points while Caidic scored 21, to lead the Filipinos in a 108–100 overtime victory to capture the Jones Cup title. Keady, later, told Ron Jacobs that he had the highest respect for two Filipino cagers whom he called 'Heckle and Jeckle' (referring to Allan Caidic and Samboy Lim).

He led the Philippines in capturing the 1985 South East Asian Games Gold Medal and in 1986, he led the last all-amateur national team to capture the FIBA Asia Championship gold medal and scored 22 points in an 82–72 win over China in the finals. After winning the Asian Championship, the Philippines qualified for the 1986 FIBA World Championship at Madrid, Spain, but due to the political crisis in the country (that led to the 1986 Philippine People Power EDSA Revolution), the national team did not participate in the tournament.
He is a four-time Asian Games veteran  as a player and shared this distinction with Alvin Patrimonio, as the only PBA players to play in four Asiads (1986, 1990, 1994, 1998). In 1986, he led an all-amateur national team to an Asian Games bronze medal, after a heart breaking controversial loss to South Korea in the semi-final. He is also the only Filipino player to win the William Jones Cup championships twice, once as an amateur in 1985 and once as a professional in 1998.

PBA career

Great Taste/Presto Tivoli

In 1984–1985, Caidic played in the PBA for the all-amateur guest NCC national team, preparing for international competitions, and went on to win the 1985 PBA Reinforced Conference.

In 1987, he was drafted first overall by the Great Taste Coffee Makers and played alongside Ricardo Brown to lead the team to the PBA Open Conference finals (In Game 3, he equalled Brown's PBA all-time record for the most points scored by a Filipino in a single Finals game - 48 points) and later captured his first PBA-All Filipino Cup championship. In his rookie season, he earned the 1987 PBA Rookie of the Year award and was named in the All-Star Mythical Five Selection, where he became the third first year-rookie player ever to be named in the Mythical Five Selection after Arnie Tuadles (1979) and Ricardo Brown (1983). He also finished the season as the first rookie player ever to lead the league in scoring.

On November 2, 1989, Caidic scored 68 points and 15 three-point field goals made in a single game to lead Presto Tivoli past the Alaska Air Force in a high-scoring overtime game 175–159. Both teams' combined points was one of the most in the PBA history.

In 1990, he set the PBA all-time record for the most three-point field goals made in a single season (160 triples) and led Presto Tivoli to a championship title. He was named the 1990 PBA Most Valuable Player and was selected to play for the first all-pro national team coached by Robert Jaworski, bound for the Asian Games. In one of his Asian Games appearances, he led the national team's second half comeback win, 86–78, against Japan with 34 points despite playing with a broken hand and held scoreless in the first half. The Philippines went on to win the silver medal after losing to China in the finals with Caidic and Samboy Lim named in the mythical 5 selection.

On October 15, 1991, he broke the PBA all-time record for the most three-point field goals made in a career with 594 three-point conversions after scoring 9 triples in Tivoli's 125–142 loss to Pepsi.

One month later, on November 21, 1991, Caidic sets the PBA all-time records of the most points in a single game by a homegrown Filipino player (79 points), the most points in a single half (53 points), the most points in a single quarter (37 points), the most three-point field goals made and attempts in a game (17/27 triples), the most three-point field goals made in a quarter (8 triples) and the most consecutive three-point field goals made in a single game (8 triples), to lead Presto Tivoli against Ginebra San Miguel. His performance remains as one of the greatest individual performances in the PBA history. What makes it more remarkable is that while he was playing in the court, his wife Millote was giving birth to their first daughter. He came off the bench late in the first quarter and left the game in the middle of the fourth, in a game where he could have possibly scored 100 points or more.

San Miguel Beermen

In 1993, Caidic was acquired by the San Miguel Beermen after his former team was sold to Sta. Lucia Realty & Development, Inc. and renamed Sta. Lucia Realtors. During his time with San Miguel, he teamed up with Samboy Lim to form the league's deadliest scoring duo in the 1990s and led the Beermen to the 1993 All-Filipino Cup finals. He ended the season winning the PBA Governor's Cup championship with San Miguel and earned the 1993 PBA All-Star Most Valuable Player award after leading his team (North All-Star) to victory, scoring 40 points (second highest points scored in a single All-Star game) and 9 triples (the most three-point field goals made in a single All-Star game). He became the first PBA player ever to win the MVP awards in the regular season and in the All-Star Game.

In 1994, San Miguel won the right to represent the country in the Asian Games after winning the PBA All-Filipino Cup conference title. In the Asian Games, the Beermen formed the core of the national team with some loaned players from the other PBA ballclubs like Alvin Patrimonio and Johnny Abarrientos. The national team finished fourth but he finished as the Asian Games basketball tournament leading scorer and was named in the all-tournament Mythical Five Selection.

In 1995, he became the eighth player to score 10,000 career points in the PBA history and the league's first player to score 1,000 career three-point field goals. He went on to win the PBA Governor's Cup Best Player of the Conference after leading the San Miguel Beermen to the finals. He finished the season as the league's leading point scorer with 20.9 points per game, the last guard ever to lead the league in season-best points scoring average in the 20th century.

On April 29, 1997, in a game between the Gordon's Gin and the San Miguel Beermen, he suffered a serious career-threatening injury. The incident took place when he jumped for a rebound, he collided with teammate Nelson Asaytono, fell on the floor headfirst, vomited, and remained on the court motionless before he was removed from the arena and taken to the hospital.

He made a successful recovery from that injury and in 1998, he was selected by Tim Cone for the Philippine Centennial Team bound for the William Jones Cup (where he scored 25 points with six triples against South East Asian rival, Thailand) and the Asian Games. The team started their international campaign against China and a PBA All-Star Selection but had a dismal display in the PBA Centennial Cup. They went to a tough United States midwest tour and won the William Jones Cup in Taiwan. In the Asian Games, the nationals easily won their group stage but lost in the semi-final and settled for third after beating Kazakhstan in their final game.

Post-playing career, retirement and coaching

In 1999, Caidic became the playing coach of the Barangay Ginebra Kings after a sudden resignation of interim coach Rino Salazar.

In 2000, as a playing coach, he placed himself in the reserved unprotected player list for the Barangay Ginebra Kings to protect other important players in the team. The expansion team Red Bull picked unprotected players from the dispersal draft, which includes himself and got his rights. To avoid leaving Ginebra and playing for Red Bull, he announced his retirement and decided to hang up his jersey that year. His early retirement ended a long distinguished career that started in 1984 as an amateur guest player in the PBA. He also became the third PBA player after Ramon Fernandez and Bogs Adornado to be given the honor of retiring the jersey number by a PBA team and was the first by two PBA teams, the San Miguel Beermen and the Barangay Ginebra Kings. Both franchises retired his number 8 jersey in honor of his legacy in the PBA. In the same year, he was named in the PBA 25 greatest players ever to play in the league's history after the PBA celebrated its 25th year as the first professional basketball league in Asia.

After his retirement, he remained with Ginebra as a full-time head coach and despite reaching the 2001 PBA All-Filipino Cup finals, he piloted Ginebra to one of its worst season runs in its franchise history. Due to fans' uproar, management blinked and promoted him as Team Manager in 2004. He also served as the national team's assistant coach in 2002 and was an active participant of the San Miguel Corporation All-Stars, a group composed of several former professional basketball players.

In May 2005, he took part in the PBA's 30th Anniversary, leading Virgilio Dalupan's Legends Team to victory, 96–92, in the PBA's Classic Greatest Game with an MVP performance, scoring 30 points (4 triples, 8 rebounds). He also led the PBA Legends Team to a two-game Australian Tour Series and earned himself the series Most Valuable Player award. He was then appointed Sports Ambassador to represent the Philippines in the 23rd South East Asian Games alongside some of the Philippines' greatest athletes (Efren Reyes, Rafael Nepomuceno) to promote the event throughout the country. Aside from being one of the country's Sports Ambassador, he also served as San Miguel Corporation's Philippine Baseball and Boxing Project Director/Liaison Officer for the South East Asian Games. His teams brought 10 gold medals (1 from baseball and 9 from boxing) for the country.

On June 15, 2006, on his 43rd birthday, he fittingly released his autobiographical book, "My Life Allan Caidic, The Triggerman", one of the first sports biographies by a Filipino athlete. In November 2006, after a reshuffling between the then-four San Miguel Corporation teams, he became the team manager of the Coca-Cola Tigers. But he left in March 2007 to become assistant coach of the Barangay Ginebra Kings.

In January 2007, he joined with former national teammates Hector Calma and Samboy Lim, as well as former national team head coaches, current national team members and head coach Chot Reyes in expressing their support to Samahang Basketbol ng Pilipinas (SBP) and for the lifting of suspension of the country from FIBA-sanctioned tournaments.

In 2008, he joined several PBA legends in a charity Tour of California but played a minor role due to personal commitments. Later that year, he led the PBA Legends to victory over the Manny Pacquiao-led  Philippine Army Basketball Team to commemorate the 75th anniversary of the army.

In August 2009, he joined another PBA legends' tour in North America, and weeks later he led a PBA All-Star Selection (scoring five straight triples in the quarter) against Dominique Wilkins'-led NBA Generations.

On August 27, 2010, he scored 54 points during the 2010 NBA Asia Basketball Challenge held at Araneta Coliseum in Quezon City. He also defeated Glen Rice, 7–5 in a three-point shooting contest. Their team won 177–167.

He was formally an assistant coach of the Barangay Ginebra San Miguel under coach Tim Cone in the PBA and the De La Salle Green Archers in the UAAP

On December 11, 2018, he scored 146 points in an exhibition game in Ilocos Sur and having 46 three-pointers in a game. His team won 184–73.

Awards and achievements

Career PBA highlights

Individual achievements
PBA Hall of Fame (2009)
PBA Top 25 Greatest Players of all time (2000)
PBA Most Valuable Player 1990
PBA Rookie of the Year  1987
PBA Mythical First Team Selection in 1987, 1988, 1989, 1990, 1991, and 1995
PBA Mythical Second Team Selection in 1993 and 1994
PBA Best Player of the Conference (1995 PBA Governor's Cup)
PBA All-Star Games (1989, 1990, 1991, 1992, 1993, 1994, 1995)
PBA All-Star Game Most Valuable Player (1993)
PBA All-Star Three-Points Shootout Challenge champion (individual event) 1991 and 1992
PBA All-Star Three-Points Shootout Challenge champion (team event) 1991
PBA Career Achievement Award 10,000 Points
PBA Career Achievement Award 5,000 Points
PBA Career Achievement Award 1,000 Three-Points
PBA Career Achievement Award 500 Steals

Team achievements
1985 PBA Reinforced Conference Champions
1987 PBA-IBA World Challenge Cup Finalists
1987 PBA Open Conference Finalists
1987 PBA All-Filipino Cup Conference Champions
1990 PBA All-Filipino Cup Conference Champions
1993 PBA All-Filipino Cup Conference Finalists
1993 PBA Governor's Cup Conference Champions
1994 PBA All-Filipino Cup Conference Champions
1995 PBA Governor's Cup Conference Finalists
1998 PBA All-Filipino Cup Conference Finalists - Playing Assistant Coach
1998 PBA Commissioner's Cup Conference Finalists - Playing Assistant Coach
1998 PBA Governor's Cup Conference, fourth place - Playing Assistant Coach
1999 PBA All-Filipino Cup Conference, third place - Playing Assistant Coach

Philippine Basketball Association all-time records
Most points scored in a single game by a Filipino (79) - November 21, 1991
Most points scored in a single half (53) - November 21, 1991
Most points scored in a single quarter (37) - November 21, 1991
Most points scored in a single finals game by a Filipino (48) - 1987 PBA Open Conference
Most number of three-point field goals made in a single game (17) - November 21, 1991
Most number of three-point field goals attempts in a single game (27) - November 21, 1991
Most consecutive three-point shots made in a single game (8) - October 15, 1991
Most number of three-point field goals made in a single quarter (9) - November 21, 1991
Most number of three-point field goals made in a single All-Star game (9) - June 6, 1993
Most consecutive free-throw shots made (76) - October 22, 1992 - May 11, 1993
Most number of three-point shots made in a single season (160) - 1990 PBA season
First Player to score 1000 career three-points field goal made in the PBA history - July 12, 1995
Third highest points scored in a single game scored by a Filipino (68) - November 2, 1989
Third highest points scored in a single quarter (27) - November 2, 1989
Third highest points scored in a single All-Star game (40) - June 6, 1993
Second highest number of three-point field goals made in a single game (15) - November 2, 1989
Sixth highest points scored in a single game by a Filipino (59) - 1988
Sixth highest points scored in a single game by a player (both locals/imports) (79) - - November 21, 1991

Former records
Most number of three-point shots made in a career (1,242) - 1987-1999 (surpassed by Jimmy Alapag)

College achievements

Individual achievements
University Athletic Association of the Philippines College Basketball Most Valuable Player (1982, 1984, 1985)
UAAP College Basketball Mythical Five Selection (1982, 1984, 1985, 1986)
PABL Mythical Five Selection (1985, 1986)
Philippine Basketball League Top 20 Greatest Players of all time (2003)
PBL Legacy Team: 12 All-time Best players in history (2000)

Team achievements
1982 UAAP-Manila College Basketball Champions
1982 UAAP National College Basketball third place
1983 UAAP-Manila College Basketball third place
1984 UAAP-Manila College Basketball Champions
1984 UAAP National College Basketball Champions
1985 UAAP-Manila College Basketball Champions
1985 UAAP National College Basketball Champions
1985 Philippine Association of Colleges and Universities Basketball Champions
1985 Philippine Amateur Basketball League (PABL) Invitational Cup Finalists
1986 UAAP-Manila College Basketball Champions
1986 UAAP National College Basketball second place
1986 Philippine Amateur Basketball League Champions

College and amateur basketball all-time records
Career all-time PBL record leader for most three-point field goals made in a single game (15 triples) - 1986
Career all-time UAAP record leader for most three-point field goals made in a single game (10 triples) - August 1985
Career all-time National UAAP leader for most three-point field goals made in a single game (9 triples) - UAAP
Second career all-time UAAP record leader for most points scored in a single finals game (48 points) - 1985
Third career all-time UAAP record leader for most points scored in a single finals game (42 points) - 1985

International career highlights
Club and Country
1982 ASEAN School Youth Basketball Championship champions
1983 Asian Invitational Basketball Tournament, third place
1984 William Jones Cup
1984 FIBA Asia Champions Cup champions
1985 Pesta Sukan Basketball Championship champions
1985 William Jones Cup champions
1985 World Clubs Championship, Group B fourth place
1985 South East Asian Games champions
1986 FIBA Asia Championship champions
1986 Guam Invitational Basketball Tournament champions
Guam Tournament Most Valuable Player (1986)
1986 Asian Games, third place (bronze medal)
1990 Asian Games, second place (silver medal)
Asian Games All-Star Mythical Five member (1990)
1991 China-PBA All-Stars Goodwill Exhibition Series
1994 Asian Games, fourth place
Asian Games Tournament top scorer (1994)
Asian Games All-Star Mythical Five member (1994)
1998 Philippines-PBA All-Stars Selection Goodwill Series
1998 PBA Centennial Cup
1998 William Jones Cup champions
1998 Philippine Tour of the United States
1998 Asian Games, third place (bronze medal)

Coaching/managerial career achievements
1998 PBA All-Filipino Cup Conference Finalists - Playing Assistant Coach
1998 PBA Commissioner's Cup Conference Finalists - Playing Assistant Coach
1998 PBA Governor's Cup Conference, fourth place - Playing Assistant Coach
1999 PBA All-Filipino Cup Conference, third place - Playing Assistant Coach
2001 PBA All-Filipino Cup Conference Finalists - Head Coach 
2001 PBA All-Stars Game Head Coach
2002 Philippines-Chinese-Taipei Goodwill Series winner, Assistant Coach 
2002 Philippines-Qatar Goodwill Series winner, Assistant Coach 
2002 Philippines-Melbourne Tigers Goodwill Series, Assistant Coach 
2002 Euro Basketball Challenge Four Nations Invitational  (Philippines Tour of Europe), third place, Assistant Coach 
2002 Asian Games, fourth place, Assistant Coach 
2004 PBA Fiesta Cup Conference Champions - Team Manager 
2004-05 PBA All-Filipino Cup Conference Champions - Team Manager 
2005-06 PBA Fiesta Cup Conference, fourth place - Team Manager
2008 PBA Fiesta Cup Conference Champions - Assistant Coach
2009 PBA Fiesta Cup Conference Finalists - Assistant Coach
2011 PBA Commissioner's Cup Conference Finalists - Assistant Coach
2012 PBA Legends Game - Playing Coach of the Stalwart Team
2013 PBA Commissioner's Cup Conference Finalists - Assistant Coach
2013 University Athletics Association of the Philippines (UAAP) Champions - Assistant Coach
2013 Philippine Collegiate Champions League (PCCL) Champions - Assistant Coach

Other achievements
PBA All-Star Legends Shootout Challenge champion (2004)
PBA Classic All-Star Greatest Game (2005)
PBA Classic All-Star Greatest Game Most Valuable Player (2005)
PBA Legends Tour of Australia (2005)
PBA Legends Tour of Australia Series Most Valuable Player (2005)
2005 Philippine South East Asian Games Sports Ambassador
NBA Asia Challenge (2009, 2010)
ASEAN Chinese Veterans Basketball Championship Over-50 champions (2016, 2017)
World Chinese Veterans Basketball Championship Over-50 champions (2016)

See also
Philippine Basketball Association
Philippine national basketball team
Northern Consolidated Cement / San Miguel Beer
Barangay Ginebra Kings
San Miguel Beermen
Great Taste Coffee Makers/Presto Tivoli
Philippine Centennial Team
History of Philippine Basketball

References

Publications and articles
Bocobo, Christian and Celis, Beth, Legends and Heroes of Philippine Basketball, (Philippines, 2004)
Caidic, Allan, My Life: Allan Caidic The Triggerman, (Philippines, 2006)
Dela Cruz, Juan, Book of Pinoy Facts and Records, (National Bookstore, Mandaluyong, Philippines, 2004)
King, Jenny, Great and Famous Filipinos, 2nd Edition, (Worldlink Books, Philippines, 2002)
OFW Guardian, Mr. Inside and Mr. Out, Sport, OFW Guardian, https://web.archive.org/web/20070930003521/http://www.ofwguardian.com/article.php/I29mrinside, (2006)
Philippine Basketball Association, The First 25 Years, (Philippines, 2000)

External links
Allan Caidic Player Profile
Official Website of the Philippine Basketball Association
Philippine Basketball League
San Miguel - Allan Caidic
Allan Caidic retirement

1963 births
Living people
Asian Games bronze medalists for the Philippines
Asian Games medalists in basketball
Asian Games silver medalists for the Philippines
Barangay Ginebra San Miguel players
Basketball players at the 1986 Asian Games
Basketball players at the 1990 Asian Games
Basketball players at the 1994 Asian Games
Basketball players at the 1998 Asian Games
Basketball players from Metro Manila
Competitors at the 1985 Southeast Asian Games
Filipino men's basketball coaches
Great Taste Coffee Makers players
Medalists at the 1986 Asian Games
Medalists at the 1990 Asian Games
Medalists at the 1998 Asian Games
People from Pasig
Philippine Basketball Association All-Stars
San Miguel Beermen coaches
Philippine Basketball Association executives
Philippine Basketball Association players with retired numbers
Philippines men's national basketball team players
Filipino men's basketball players
Player-coaches
San Miguel Beermen players
Shooting guards
Southeast Asian Games gold medalists for the Philippines
Southeast Asian Games competitors for the Philippines
Southeast Asian Games medalists in basketball
UE Red Warriors basketball players
Great Taste Coffee Makers draft picks
Barangay Ginebra San Miguel coaches
De La Salle Green Archers basketball coaches